Graphing Calculator may refer to:

 Graphing calculators, calculators that are able to display and/or analyze mathematical function graphs
 NuCalc, a computer software program able to perform many graphing calculator functions
 Grapher, the Mac OS X successor to NuCalc